Scotts Landing, also called Mahurangi East, is a rural settlement in the Auckland Region of New Zealand. It is at the end of a narrow peninsula on the eastern side of Mahurangi Harbour. Algies Bay is to the north.

Mahurangi Regional Park at Scott Point (often called Scotts Landing) has a historic building, the Scott Homestead built in 1877. A causeway between Scotts Landing and  Casnell Island (Motu Maunganui) is accessible.at low tide. The island was a pā site in the 16th century.

Burton Wells Scenic Reserve is a park named after a local surveyor.

Mahurangi Heads School operated from 1869. It closed in the 1920s or 1930s, but the school building was still standing about 1941.

Demographics
Scotts Landing-Mahurangi East is part of the larger Algies Bay-Scotts Landing statistical area.

Scotts Landing-Mahurangi East had a population of 177 at the 2018 New Zealand census, a decrease of 18 people (−9.2%) since the 2013 census, and an increase of 12 people (7.3%) since the 2006 census. There were 87 households, comprising 90 males and 87 females, giving a sex ratio of 1.03 males per female, with 12 people (6.8%) aged under 15 years, 12 (6.8%) aged 15 to 29, 69 (39.0%) aged 30 to 64, and 84 (47.5%) aged 65 or older.

Ethnicities were 100.0% European/Pākehā, 6.8% Māori, and 1.7% other ethnicities. People may identify with more than one ethnicity.

Although some people chose not to answer the census's question about religious affiliation, 55.9% had no religion, 30.5% were Christian and 3.4% were Buddhist.

Of those at least 15 years old, 60 (36.4%) people had a bachelor's or higher degree, and 15 (9.1%) people had no formal qualifications. 39 people (23.6%) earned over $70,000 compared to 17.2% nationally. The employment status of those at least 15 was that 42 (25.5%) people were employed full-time, 36 (21.8%) were part-time, and 3 (1.8%) were unemployed.

Notes

Matakana Coast
Rodney Local Board Area
Populated places in the Auckland Region